William Connelly earned one cap with the U.S. national team in a 6-3 loss to England on June 8, 1953. At the time, he played with Brookhattan of the American Soccer League.

References

External links
 

Living people
Year of birth missing (living people)
American soccer players
United States men's international soccer players
American Soccer League (1933–1983) players
New York Brookhattan players
Association football defenders